In algebra, a presentation of a monoid (or a presentation of a semigroup) is a description of a monoid (or a semigroup) in terms of a set  of generators and a set of relations on the free monoid  (or the free semigroup ) generated by . The monoid is then presented as the quotient of the free monoid (or the free semigroup) by these relations. This is an analogue of a group presentation in group theory.

As a mathematical structure, a monoid presentation is identical to a string rewriting system (also known as a semi-Thue system). Every monoid may be presented by a semi-Thue system (possibly over an infinite alphabet).

A presentation should not be confused with a representation.

Construction 

To form the quotient monoid, these relations are extended to monoid congruences as follows:

In the typical situation, the relation  is simply given as a set of equations, so that . Thus, for example,

is the equational presentation for the bicyclic monoid, and

is the plactic monoid of degree 2 (it has infinite order).

Inverse monoids and semigroups

Presentations of inverse monoids and semigroups can be defined in a similar way using a pair

where

is a binary relation between words.

We use this pair of objects to define an inverse monoid

or

Notes

References
 John M. Howie, Fundamentals of Semigroup Theory (1995), Clarendon Press, Oxford 
 M. Kilp, U. Knauer, A.V. Mikhalev, Monoids, Acts and Categories with Applications to Wreath Products and Graphs, De Gruyter Expositions in Mathematics vol. 29, Walter de Gruyter, 2000, .
 Ronald V. Book and Friedrich Otto, String-rewriting Systems, Springer, 1993, chapter 7, "Algebraic Properties"

Semigroup theory